Oliver Musila Litondo (born 1948) is a Kenyan actor, journalist and news anchor.  He is known for portraying Kimani Maruge in the 2010 biographical film The First Grader.  For his portrayal as Maruge, Litondo won the AARP Movies for Grownups Award for Best Actor and the Black Film Critics Circle Award for Best Actor.  He was also nominated for the NAACP Image Award for Outstanding Actor in a Motion Picture for his performance in The First Grader.

Litondo is a graduate of the University of Iowa, Stockholm University and Harvard University.  He is married to Beldina.  Litondo is a recipient of the Kalasha Lifetime Achievement award.

Filmography

References

External links

1940s births
Living people
Kenyan male film actors
Kenyan male television actors
20th-century Kenyan male actors
21st-century Kenyan male actors
University of Iowa alumni
Stockholm University alumni
Harvard University alumni
Kenyan journalists